Expedition of Khalid ibn al-Walid, to Mecca, against Banu Jadhimah, took place in January 630 AD, 8AH, 9th month, of the Islamic Calendar.

Khalid ibn al-Walid was sent to invite the Banu Jadhimah tribe to Islam. They accepted the invitation, but Khalid took all of them prisoners and executed a portion of the tribe anyway (before he was stopped).

Expedition against Banu Jadhimah
On his return from Nakhla expedition to destroy al-Uzza, Khalid bin Al-Waleed at the head of 350 horsemen of Helpers, Emigrants and Banu Saleem was dispatched once again in the same year 8 A.H to the habitation of Bani Khuzaimah bedouins, who used the term Sabians, those who left their former religion, to describe themselves.

His mission was to invite them to Islam. Many of the tribe members accepted the offer and converted to Islam. However Khalid ibn Walid had a history with this tribe. 

Khalid ibn Walid tied them up and made them all prisoners and ordered their execution after he sensed their conversion to be a trick. A portion were put to death, before some other Muslims who were citizens of Medina came along and intervened, stopping Khalid.

News of bloodshed reached Muhammad. He was deeply grieved and raised his hands towards the heaven, uttering these words: "O Allâh! I am innocent of what Khalid has done," twice.  He immediately sent ‘Ali to make every possible reparation to the tribes who had been wronged. After a careful inquiry, ‘Ali paid the blood-money to all those who suffered loss. The remaining portion was also distributed amongst the members of the tribe in order to alleviate their suffering. Khalid, had a disagreement with ‘Abdur Rahman bin ‘Awf. Hearing this, Muhammad got angry, and ordered Khalid to stop that altercation adding that as his Companions (meaning Khalid and ‘Abdur Rahman bin ‘Awf), they were too high in rank to be involved in such unnecessary arguments.

Islamic sources

Islamic primary sources
An early written mention of this event is in the Sirat Rasul Allah (Life of Muhammad) by Ibn Ishaq, written just over 150 years after Muhammad's death.  According to this work, Khalid was sent to the Banu Jadhimah tribe. Khalid persuaded them to disarm by acknowledging that they had become Muslims, and then killed some of them. When Muhammad heard of this, he declared to God that he was innocent of what Khalid had done, and sent 'Ali b. Abi Talilb to pay the survivors compensation.

The event is also mentioned by the later Muslim Scholar Ibn Sa'd in his book "Kitab al-tabaqat al-kabir", as follows:

The Expedition is mentioned in the Sunni hadith collection Sahih al-Bukhari as follows:

Muhammad Muhsin Khan, said in his book "The Translation of the Meanings Of Sahih Al-Bukhari", that Muhammad sent Khalid to fight the Banu Jadhima, and used this hadith as a reference

Modern scholars
The Muslim scholar Muhammad Husayn Haykal (d. 1956), in his book "The Life of Muhammad" writes that Khalid intended to kill the people, he writes:

The late James A. Bellamy, Professor Emeritus of Arabic Literature at the University of Michigan, wrote:

See also
Military career of Muhammad
List of expeditions of Muhammad

References

630
Campaigns ordered by Muhammad